Saint Philip Neri: I Prefer Heaven is a 2010 Italian television movie written and directed by Giacomo Campiotti. The film is based on real life events of Roman Catholic priest and then Saint Philip Neri.

Plot 
This movie follows the sharp-witted and caring Philip Neri-on a quest for heaven.

Cast 

 Gigi Proietti as Philip Neri
 Adriano Braidotti as Alessandro
 Francesco Salvi as  Persiano Rosa
 Roberto Citran as  Cardinal Capurso
 Sebastiano Lo Monaco as  Prince Nerano
 Francesca Chillemi as  Ippolita
 Antonio Silvestre as  Michele
 Josafat Vagni as  Mezzapagnotta 
 Francesca Antonelli as  Zaira
  Niccolò Senni as  Pierotto 
  Emiliano Coltorti as  Camillo
 Sergio Fiorentini as Pope Sixtus V
  Paolo Paoloni as  Pope Gregory XIII

References

External links

2010 television films
2010 films
Italian television films
2010 biographical drama films
Films set in Italy
Italian biographical drama films
Films about Catholic priests
Films about religion
Films directed by Giacomo Campiotti
Philip Neri
Cultural depictions of Italian men
2010s Italian films